Christina McHale was the defending champion, but lost in the semifinals to Zarina Diyas.

Qualifier Diyas went on to win her first WTA title, defeating another qualifier Miyu Kato in the final, 6–2, 7–5.

Former world no. 4 Kimiko Date played her last professional match at this tournament, losing in straight sets to Aleksandra Krunić in the first round.

Seeds

Draw

Finals

Top half

Bottom half

Qualifying

Seeds

Qualifiers

Qualifying draw

First qualifier

Second qualifier

Third qualifier

Fourth qualifier

References
Main Draw
Qualifying Draw

Japan Women's Open
2017 Japan Women's Open